Thandar Moe (born 27 December 1988) is a Burmese retired footballer who played as a midfielder. She has been a member of the Myanmar women's national team.

International career
Thandar Moe capped for Myanmar at senior level during the 2010 AFC Women's Asian Cup, the 2012 AFC Women's Pre-Olympic Tournament and the 2014 AFC Women's Asian Cup qualification.

References

External links

1988 births
Living people
People from Yangon Region
Burmese women's footballers
Women's association football midfielders
Myanmar women's international footballers